Amatsuhikone (which means little lad of Heaven) in Japanese mythology is the third son of Amaterasu.

In many versions, he is born from Amaterasu's jewels in her hair. In other versions he is born from the vine used to bind Amaterasu's hair.

He is believed to be the ancestor of several clans, including the Oshikochi and Yamashiro clans.

References 

Shinto
Japanese gods
Amatsukami